Citharichthys gordae, the mimic sanddab, is a species of sanddab in the large-tooth flounder family Paralichthyidae. It is native to the eastern Pacific Ocean, found off the coast of Mexico. It has a limited distribution, found in the Magdalena Bay and along the Baja California peninsula, as well as part of the Gulf of California.

Like the rest of the large-tooth flounders, the mimic sanddab has both eyes on the left side of its head. It is a brownish color, mottled with darker patches.

References

Citharichthys gordae. FishBase. Accessed September 22, 2009

Citharichthys
Western North American coastal fauna
Fish of Mexican Pacific coast
Fish described in 1938
Taxa named by William Beebe
Taxa named by John Tee-Van